Maredudd ap Tewdws (died c. 797) was a king of Dyfed in South Wales.

His father was Tewdws son of Rhain ap Cadwgan. His sons, who both reigned after him, were Rhain and Owain.

His lineage is included among the Harleian Genealogies. His death was recorded in the Annals of Wales. The entry is undated, but Phillimore's reconstruction places it in AD 797.

References

790s deaths
8th-century Welsh monarchs
Monarchs of Dyfed
Year of birth unknown
Year of death uncertain